Semenivka is a town in Novhorod-Siverskyi Raion, Chernihiv Oblast (province) of Ukraine. It hosts the administration of Semenivka urban hromada, one of the hromadas of Ukraine. Population:

History
Ancient Semenivka was founded in 1680 by Colonel Starodub Regiment, son of Ukrainian Hetman Ivan Samoilovych. Semyon Samoylovych was a Cossack sloboda. Though while Semenivka was assigned to Semyon Samoylovych, it was privately owned by Semen Samoilovych and his descendants until 1861. Because of the advantageous border location and good talent in the households of Semenivka, the town rapidly increased in population, eventually becoming center of the parish which included the surrounding villages.

The modern city of Semenivka is the administrative center of the Semenivka Raion within the Chernihiv Oblast. The Semenivka area was created in September 26, 1926. In 1932 the Semenivka Raion became a part of the Chernihiv Oblast and gained the status of a city in 1958. The Semenivka Raion is located in the northeastern part of the Chernihiv Oblast. It borders Novhorod-Siverskyi, the Chernihiv region of Koriukivka and the Starodub areas of the Bryansk Raion in the Russian Federation. The structure of the ((Semenivka Raion)) has 17 rural councils. The area of Semenivka Rayon is 1470 kilometers and the population of the is approximately 18,000 inhabitants. However the population of the city of Semenivka as of January 1, 2016 was 8,318 people.

Until 18 July 2020, Semenivka was the administrative center of Semenivka Raion. The raion was abolished in July 2020 as part of the administrative reform of Ukraine, which reduced the number of raions of Chernihiv Oblast to five. The area of Semenivka Raion was merged into Novhorod-Siverskyi Raion.

Geography and climate
The area has a temperate continental climate, formed mainly by Atlantic air masses. It is one of the wettest areas in Ukraine, with yearly rainfalls averaging 56 cm. Average temperature for the year is 5.7 degrees. Absolute maximum summer temperature is 41.4 °C, and the absolute minimum winter temperature is -37 °C Celsius. In the eastern part of the city Semenivka is the river Revna- is the left tributary of the River Snov (Снов). The river Drest (or Drost) runs through the area from north to south.

Soils on the territory Semenivka are sod-podzolic and peat bog. The average soil fertility score  on a 100-point scale has a composition of 37 points. Surrounding Semenivka are peat marshes that have some local industrial interest. 20% of the city's territory and 36% percent of the Semenivka Raion is occupied by pine forests. In these pine forests are a significant planting of birch, pine, oak and other trees. The area also has diverse fauna such as 60 species of mammals, 276 species of birds, 3 species of snakes, 12 species of amphibians, 30 species of fish and numerous species of insects. On the river Drest there is a man-made waterway in the natural channel with an area of 5 hectares of surface water.

Demographics
As of January 1, 2016, population of Seminivka totaled 8318 residents with 3822 men and 4496 women. The age composition of Semenivka is the following, from 0 to 19 years: 1692 inhabitants; from 20–35 years: 1780 residents; from 35–60, 3061 residents; from 60–70 years: 452; from ages 70 years and older registered unemployed: 778 residents; Officially-155 residents; and from this group 3167 residents are Pensioners.

Economy
The state-run Semenivka Forestry Company, a private local company, and several private sawmills are in operation. There is a factory which sews footwear and bedding sets. Irvantsevskyy Peat factory is located in the village of Angles near the Seminivka and the Seminivka City Council, which produces peat briquettes.

The Semenivka agricultural enterprise Agro is the largest agribusiness in the area. In the agricultural sectors are Semenovskoe Cereal and Semenov Rayahrohim, having a partnership with private farmers. There is a Powered Semenivka railway station and Bus transportation is carried out by several private entities.

Culture
The Day of the City is September 21.

Government
The head of the city is Бичков Олександр Федорович (Bychkov Alexander Federovich)

References

External links
 The murder of the Jews of Semenivka during World War II, at Yad Vashem website.

Cities in Chernihiv Oblast
Cities of district significance in Ukraine
Novozybkovsky Uyezd
Holocaust locations in Ukraine